Jabučje is a village in the municipality of Kragujevac, Serbia. According to the 2011 census, the village has a population of 165 inhabitants.

Population

References

Populated places in Šumadija District